A mud horse is a traditional type of  hand-built wooden sledge used for fishing in Bridgwater Bay.

Twenty-first century usage
As of 2010 the only remaining mud-horse fisherman was fifth generation fisherman Adrian Sellick.  His father, Brendan, was still selling the catch from Mudhorse Cottage in Stolford.

References

Fishing equipment
Human-powered vehicles